Polyzosteria is a genus of around sixteen species of cockroaches in the Blattidae family native to Australia. Some of these insects are attractively marked, such as Polyzosteria mitchelli.  The type species of the genus is the Botany Bay cockroach, Polyzosteria limbata.

The genus was first described in 1838 by Hermann Burmeister.

Species
The following species are recognised :

Polyzosteria aenea Burmeister, 1838
Polyzosteria australica (Brancsik, 1895)
Polyzosteria cuprea Saussure, 1863
Polyzosteria flavomaculosa Mackerras, 1965
Polyzosteria fulgens Mackerras, 1965
Polyzosteria invisa Walker, 1868
Polyzosteria limbata Burmeister, 1838
Polyzosteria magna Shaw, 1914
Polyzosteria metallica (Shaw, 1914)
Polyzosteria mitchelli (Angas, 1847)
Polyzosteria obscuroviridis Tepper, 1893
Polyzosteria oculata Tepper, 1893
Polyzosteria pubescens Tepper, 1893
Polyzosteria pulchra Mackerras, 1965
Polyzosteria rouxi Chopard, 1924
Polyzosteria terrosa Chopard, 1924
Polyzosteria viridissima Shelford, 1909
Polyzosteria yingina Henry, 2020

References

Cockroach genera
Taxa named by Hermann Burmeister
Insects described in 1838